Milutin Vučinić (12 April 1869 in Gornji Rogami, Piperi, Montenegro – 14 September 1922 in Rome, Italy) was a Montenegrin soldier and politician.

Biography
Vučinić was the son of brigadier Mijajlo Nišin Vučinić and Marica Vučinić (née Marković). He graduated from a military academy in Italy. During the First Balkan War, he commanded the Spuž brigade.

On 4/17 February 1919, Milutin Vučinić was appointed as Minister of the Military of the Government of the Kingdom of Montenegro in Exile, a position which he held until his death. On 15 June 1921, he was also named Minister of Finance of the Government in Exile, a position which he held until September 1922.

On 28 June 1922, he became the Prime Minister of the Kingdom of Montenegro in Exile.

Vučinić died of a heart attack on 14 September 1922 in Rome, at the age of 53. He was survived by his wife Marija Vučinić (née Plamenac), from Crmnica, his three sons: Dragutin, Niša and Vladimir, and his two daughters: Draginja and Darinka.

References

External links
Biography on Montenegrina (Montenegrin)

  

1869 births
1922 deaths
Montenegrin soldiers
Finance ministers of Montenegro
Government ministers of Montenegro
Montenegrin nationalists
Defence ministers of Montenegro